María Ximena Urbina Carrasco is a Chilean historian. She is best known for her work on the colonial era in the fjords and channels of Patagonia. She did her undergraduate studies at the Catholic University of Valparaiso and her Ph.D. at the University of Seville. Her work has earner her various history awards. Since 2015 she is a full member of the Naval and Maritime History Academy of Chile.

References

20th-century Chilean historians
21st-century Chilean historians
Maritime historians
Historians of the Captaincy General of Chile
Living people
Chilean women historians
Academic staff of the University of Seville
Academic staff of the Pontifical Catholic University of Valparaíso
Pontifical Catholic University of Valparaíso alumni
Year of birth missing (living people)